The Indian Railway Health Service (IRHS) is an organized central Group A civil service of the Government of India under Ministry of Railways consisting of doctors recruited by the Union Public Service Commission's(UPSC) Combined Medical Services Examination. It is an organized service like administrative services or engineering services. The officers of this service are responsible for providing comprehensive health care to the serving railway employees, retired railway employees and their dependents as well as other categories of staff such as contractors, vendors and licensed porters.  The Indian Railway Medical Service (IRMS) has been  renamed as Indian Railway Health Service (IRHS) from 15 January 2020 because of new introduction of Indian Railways Management Service(IRMS).

Recruitment & training
The direct recruitment to the cadre is done through the Combined Medical Services Examination held by Union Public Service Commission (UPSC).As of 2014, the approximate cadre strength of IRHS is 2,597. The candidates will take the Computer based examination in two Papers, each Paper carrying a maximum of
250 marks. Each Paper will be of two hours duration followed by a
Personality test carrying 100 marks of such of the candidates who qualify on the results of the Computer based examination. The training of the probationers is done in "Railway Staff College", now National Academy of Indian Railways,Lalbaug Vadodara along with trainees of other services like IRAS . It includes lectures on Indian railway rules and administration and sports and cultular activities and it may include a week long outdoor visit (like a trek of some mountain peak) as a team  After completion of training, they are posted as Assistant Divisional Medical Officers across the Indian Railways network. Usually graduates are posted at Health units and post graduates are posted at divisional hospitals but the final authority exists with the higher administration and postings are given keeping in mind the existing needs of the medical officer. To this date, officials of the organisation are serving railway employees , retired officers and their dependents successfully.

Role and function
To perform following three important functions:

Functions related to industrial medicine
To attend Railway accident & other untoward incidences
Pre employment Medical examination to allow only fit & suitable candidates to join the services.
PME (Periodical Medical Examination) of serving employees to allow fit persons to continue in those jobs which are related to safe running of the train.
To conduct medical Boards & other medical certification of serving employees.
To control loss of man-days on account of sickness.
To ensure safe water supply at Railway Station:
To constantly check on quality of drinking water and food made available at Railway Stations.
Certification of dead bodies at Railway Station, Railway Yards, Railway line etc.( It may be noted that MLC should be made before certification of dead bodies, otherwise any doctor can later on have to face charges of collusion. Therefore certification of dead bodies should be done after the local police shifts the dead body to the nearest hospital and not at the railway station itself.)
Certification of perishable goods in Railway Station about their disposal.

Functions related to medical treatment to Railway beneficiaries
To provide curative health care at primary, secondary and tertiary level.
To provide preventive health care.
To provide promotive health care.

Railway Territorial Army Duty
Railway has six Territorial Army Regiments. Railway doctors are part of Railway Territorial Army units and annually attend one month in training camp and perform other duties assigned to them in unit.

Organisation
The cadre is headed by a Director General, Railway Health Service (DG/RHS) reports to the Railway board at Rail Bhawan, New Delhi. 
At the Railway board level, the DG/RHS is assisted by Executive Director (ED/General), Executive Director (ED/Planning), Director/Health and Family welfare, Director/Industrial Health and other officers.

At the Zonal level, the operations of the medical services are headed by a Chief Medical Director (CMD) who acts as the administrative head of the entire zone. The CMD is assisted by Chief Health Director (CHD), Additional Chief Health Director (ACHD) and by Additional Chief Medical Director (ACMD) & Dy. Chief Medical Directors (Dy.CMD).

At the divisional level, the operations are headed by a Chief Medical Superintendent (CMS). In some divisions, Additional Chief Medical Superintendent (ACMS) or Medical Superintendent (MS)-in-charge head the functioning of the medical department.

At the sub-divisional or peripheral level, the operations might be headed by Additional Chief Medical Superintendent (ACMS) or Senior Divisional Medical Officers (Sr.DMO) and in some cases, by the Divisional Medical Officer (DMO).

Grades and designation

See also
 Centralised Training Institutes of the Indian Railways
 Indian Railways organisational structure

References

External links
 Profile of Indian Railway Health Service (IRHS)
 Indian Railways official website
 Health Directorate, Indian Railways

Medical Services
Healthcare in India